In Māori tradition, Tokomaru was one of the great ocean-going canoes that were used in the migrations that settled New Zealand. It was commanded by Manaia. His brother-in-law had originally owned the canoe.  When Manaia's wife was raped by a group of men, he slew them, including the chief Tupenu. Killing his brother-in-law, he took the Tokomaru and set sail with his family for New Zealand. Landing at Whangaparaoa, they finally settled at Taranaki. Te Āti Awa, Ngāti Mutunga, Ngāti Tama iwi trace their ancestry back to Tokomaru.

References
R.D. Craig, Dictionary of Polynesian Mythology (Greenwood Press: New York, 1989), 25.

See also
List of Māori waka

Māori waka
Māori mythology